Kirby Doyle (November 27, 1932 – April 5, 2003), born Stanton Doyle, was an American poet. He was featured in the New American Poetry anthology, with the so-called "third generation" of American modernist poets. He was one of the San Francisco Renaissance poets who laid the groundwork for Beat poetry in San Francisco. Doyle also wrote novels.

Life and literary work
Doyle was born in San Francisco, California. A United States Army veteran, Doyle was pursuing art and culinary studies at San Francisco State University when he published several poems in the school's literary magazine. This led to his association with Robert Duncan, Lew Welch, and Kenneth Rexroth. But Doyle  stressed the directness of the spoken word over formal poetry. In the late 1950s, Doyle wrote Sapphobones, a collection of playful and evocative love poems, which cemented his literary reputation. 
Words like mad exotic birds fluttering
from my thorax
whipping my speech -- moist and gaudy feathers
gone from my lips upward.

His work appeared alongside that of Jack Kerouac, Lawrence Ferlinghetti, and Allen Ginsberg in the Spring, 1958 issue of Chicago Review, which was devoted to "San Francisco Renaissance" writers. Several of his poems were published on broadsheets by the Communication Company, the publishing arm of the Diggers.

Although his work maintained the directness of colloquial speech, it could also be lyrical and rhapsodic. Doyle's poems were sometimes humorous. He was a Romantic at heart. He adored the works of John Keats, Emily Dickinson and the great 'projective verse' of Charles Olson.

Doyle was a mainstay of the North Beach literary scene in San Francisco from the late seventies until his incarceration in Laguna Honda hospital for dementia and the effects of diabetes. Prior to that he had lived for long stretches of time on communes near Mount Tamalpais. The poet Michael McClure said of him: "He was a handsome, big-smiled Irish American rascal. He was an original Beat, loose-jointed, with a great laugh. His poetry was beautiful stuff."

Doyle died on April 5, 2003 in Laguna Honda Hospital in San Francisco. He was one of the few writers of the San Francisco Renaissance who were both born and died in the city.

Publications
Sapphobones (Poets Press, 1966)
Ode to John Garfield (Communication Company, 1967)
Angel Faint (Communication Company, 1968; Deep Forest,1991)
Happiness Bastard (Essex House, 1968; a novel). (Happiness Bastard, like Kerouac's On the Road, was produced on one continuous scroll of paper run through a typewriter, and the sole copy is in the Kirby Doyle Archive in the possession of Tisa Walden which also includes the unpublished Opus Pre American Ode, and other handwritten papers.
The Collected Poems of Kirby Doyle (Greenlight Press,1983)
After Olson (Deep Forest,1984)
The Questlock: Gymnopaean of A. Dianaei O'Tamal (Deep Forest,1987)
Lyric Poems (City Lights, 1988)
Crime, Justice & Tragedy and Das Erde Profundus (Deep Forest,1989)
Pre American Ode (unpublished)
White Flesh (unpublished; novel)
NEWS FLASH: the Doyle papers were acquired by The Mandeville Special Collections Library at San Diego in 2012; and the scroll of Happiness Bastard was acquired by Harvard University in 2014.  Tisa Walden

Recordings
Howls, Raps & Roars: Recordings from the San Francisco poetry renaissance (compilation) (Universal Music Group, 1963; Fantasy Records 1993). Click HERE to listen to Doyle read Angel Faint from this compilation (you must have Windows Media Player).

Further reading
Phillips, Rod. Forest Beatniks and Urban Thoreaus. Peter Lang Publishing (2000).

References

External links

The Birth of Digger Batman, a prose poem Doyle wrote on the occasion of the birth of Billy "Batman" Jahrmarkt, the son of Billy Batman, a member of the Diggers
Friday memorial for Kirby Doyle -- Beat writer, poet, an obituary in the San Francisco Chronicle''
Kirby Doyle and the Snows of Yesteryear, remembrances of Doyle by Michael McClure in the magazine Cento.
Remembrances of Kirby Doyle by Michael McClure, Peter Coyote,Tisa Walden, Philomene Long and John Thomas, and Claude Hayward.
Kirby Doyle (1932-2003), remembrance of Doyle by Jack Foley
Ode to John Garfield, a Doyle poem published by the Diggers
Photo of Doyle (on right) with Billy Batman
Kirby Doyle Papers MSS 0757. Special Collections & Archives, UC San Diego Library.

1932 births
2003 deaths
20th-century American novelists
Beat Generation writers
Poets from California
Diggers (theater)
Writers from the San Francisco Bay Area
20th-century American poets
American male novelists
American male poets
20th-century American male writers